The Carillon Canal is a National Historic Site of Canada in Saint-André-d'Argenteuil, Quebec. It preserves the historic Carillon Canal that was first built in the 1830s to facilitate travel on the Ottawa River. It is a prominent heritage site and recreation area, visited annually by 20,000 pleasure boaters and 30,000 people who use its riverside park.

In addition to the original canal itself, other items of historical interest are:
 the remains of lock No. 1, built between 1830 and 1833
 the superintendent's and toll collector's houses
 the jetty of the second canal built between 1873 and 1882
 the Carillon Barracks, currently housing the Regional Argenteuil Museum.

History
The impetus for these canals was the War of 1812. During this war, attacks along the Saint Lawrence River jeopardized the communication lines between Kingston and Montreal, the two main military positions of Upper and Lower Canada. The Ottawa River Canals and the Rideau Canal were thus designed as an alternative military supply route in the event of war with the Americans.

Work began first on the Grenville Canal in 1818. In 1819, Captain Henry Vernet of the Royal Corps of Engineering arrived from Britain to lead the construction of the project. Hundreds of Irish immigrants and French Canadians excavated the canal under the direction of a hundred British soldiers.

The military requirements decided all aspects of the canal. These dimensions, standards adopted for military use, were insufficient for any commercial use. Forestry had become the main economic activity in this region, and from 1867, local business people demanded that the government carry out improvements to the network because the original canal network had become outdated. In 1870, the Canals Commission recommended making the Ottawa River deeper between Lachine and Ottawa. Therefore, between 1873 and 1882, the Grenville and Carillon Canals were enlarged (the dam built upstream from the village of Carillon raised the level of the Ottawa River at Chute-à-Blondeau, making the need for a canal and lock there no longer necessary).

The canal was designated a National Historic Site in 1929.

This work substantially and irreversibly changed the canal network. The new water level flooded the rapids of Long-Sault, transforming them into calm water.

See also 
 Sainte-Anne-de-Bellevue Canal - a canal further downstream, also a National Historic Site

References

External links
Parks Canada official website

Canals in Quebec
Tourist attractions in Laurentides
National Historic Sites in Quebec
Geography of Laurentides
Buildings and structures in Laurentides
Transport in Laurentides
Parks in Quebec
Canals opened in 1830
1830 establishments in Lower Canada